Sayakumane was king of the southern Laotian Kingdom of Champasak, 1737–1791.

Kings of Champasak
18th-century monarchs in Asia
18th-century Laotian people
Year of birth missing
Year of death missing